Fotbal Club Olimpia Rotunda is a football club from Rotunda, Olt County, Romania who currently play in Liga V.

History

In 2009–10 season, Olimpia had an amazing debut season, after comeback in Liga IV, finishing on 3rd position.

League history

References

Football clubs in Olt County
Association football clubs established in 2006
Liga IV clubs